Liu Zipeng (born 4 June 2000) is a Chinese footballer currently playing as a midfielder for Jiangxi Beidamen.

Career statistics

Club
.

References

2000 births
Living people
People from Shangrao
Footballers from Jiangxi
Chinese footballers
Association football midfielders
Tercera División players
Shandong Taishan F.C. players
Beijing Sport University F.C. players
Chinese expatriate footballers
Chinese expatriate sportspeople in Spain
Expatriate footballers in Spain